Andrei Schwartz (born 5 July 1989) is a Romanian former footballer who played as a midfielder. Schwartz made his Liga I debut on 5 May 2009 for Oțelul Galați, in a 0–1 defeat against Dinamo București. Schwartz career was not a very long one and he played for teams mainly for Liga II and Liga III such as: Oțelul's reserves team, Oțelul II Galați, Râmnicu Sărat or SC Bacău.

External links
 

1989 births
Living people
Sportspeople from Galați
Romanian footballers
Association football midfielders
Liga I players
ASC Oțelul Galați players
Liga II players